The NCAA Women's Division I Indoor Track and Field Championship is an annual collegiate indoor track and field competition for women from Division I institutions organised by the National Collegiate Athletic Association. Athletes' performances in individual championships earn points for their institutions and the team with the most points receives the NCAA team title in track and field. A separate NCAA Division I men's competition is also held. These two events are separate from the NCAA Women's Division I Outdoor Track and Field Championships and NCAA Men's Division I Outdoor Track and Field Championships held during the spring. The first edition of the championship was held in 1983. The current team champions are the Florida Gators. The LSU Lady Tigers hold the record for most team titles with 11.

Events

Track events
 
Sprint events
60 meter dash (1983–present)
200 meter dash (1983–present)
400 meter dash (1983–present)
Distance events
800 meter run (1983–present)
Mile run (1965–present)
3,000 meter run (1983–present)
5,000 meter run (1983–present)
Hurdle Events
60 meter hurdles (1983–present)
Relay events
1,600 meter relay (1983–present)
Distance medley relay (1983–present)

Field events
 
Jumping events
High jump (1983–present)
Pole vault (1995–present)
Long jump (1983–present)
Triple jump 
Throwing events
Shot put (1983–present)
Weight throw 
Multi-events
Pentathlon (2004–present)

Champions

Team titles

Championship Records

See also
AIAW Intercollegiate Women's Outdoor Track and Field Champions
NCAA Men's Outdoor Track and Field Championship (Division I, Division II, Division III)
NCAA Women's Outdoor Track and Field Championship (Division I, Division II, Division III)
NCAA Men's Indoor Track and Field Championship (Division I, Division II, Division III)
NCAA Women's Indoor Track and Field Championship (Division II, Division III)
Pre-NCAA Outdoor Track and Field Champions

References

External links
NCAA Division I women's indoor track and field

 Indoor
NCAA women Division I
Track Indoor
Recurring sporting events established in 1983
Women's athletics competitions